Artignosc-sur-Verdon ("Artignosc-on-Verdon"), often simply referred to as Artignosc, is a commune in the Var department in the Provence-Alpes-Côte d'Azur region in Southeastern France. As of 2019, it had a population of 288. Artignosc-sur-Verdon is located on the departmental border with Alpes-de-Haute-Provence to the north, on left bank of the river Verdon that marks part of it.

See also
Communes of the Var department

References

Communes of Var (department)